The 2009 Women's European Volleyball Championship was the 26th edition of the European Volleyball Championship, organised by Europe's governing volleyball body, the Confédération Européenne de Volleyball. The cities that hosted matches were Bydgoszcz, Łódź, Katowice and Wrocław in Poland, from 25 September to 4 October 2009.

Qualification

Format
The tournament was played in three different stages. In the first stage, the sixteen participants were divided in four groups (A, B, C and D) of four teams each. A single round-robin format was played within each group to determine the teams group position, the three best teams of each group (total of 12 teams) progressed to the second stage. 

The second stage of the tournament consisted of two groups of six teams each. As the first stage match results amongst the teams which advanced to this stage also counted, the two groups have been predetermined, one group formed by groups A and C teams while the other was formed by groups B and D teams. In each of the two groups, the teams played once against every opponent they haven not faced in the tournament (total of three matches each), adding that to the results obtained against the other two teams who also advanced from the first stage same group. The two group winners and two runners-up from this second stage advanced the third stage.         

The third and final stage of the tournament was composed of the semifinals, third place match and final. A drawing of lots decided which winner played which runner-up in the semifinals.

Pools composition

Squads

Venues
The tournament was played at four venues in four cities throughout Poland. Each city hosted a group stage. Łódź and Katowice hosted the two Playoff Rounds. Łódź also concluded the Championship with the Semifinals & Final.

Preliminary round

 All times are Central European Summer Time (UTC+02:00).

Pool A
venue: Arena Łódź, Łódź

|}

|}

Pool B
venue: Centennial Hall, Wrocław

|}

|}

Pool C
venue: Łuczniczka, Bydgoszcz

|}

|}

Pool D
venue: Spodek, Katowice

|}

|}

Playoff round

 All times are Central European Summer Time (UTC+02:00).

Pool E
venue: Arena Łódź, Łódź

|}

|}
The following Preliminary round matches are also valid for the pool standings:

|}

Pool F
venue: Spodek, Katowice

|}

|}
The following Preliminary round matches are also valid for the pool standings:

|}

Final round
venue: Arena Łódź, Łódź
 All times are Central European Summer Time (UTC+02:00).

A drawing of lots determined, which group-winner plays which runner-up in the semifinals.

Semifinals

|}

Bronze medal match

|}

Final

|}

Final standing

Individual awards

MVP: 
Best Scorer: 
Best Spiker: 
Best Blocker: 
Best Server: 
Best Setter: 
Best Receiver: 
Best Libero:

References
 Confédération Européenne de Volleyball (CEV)

External links
Official website
CEV Results
 Results at todor66.com

 

European Championship
V
Women's European Volleyball Championship, 2009
Volleyball
Women's European Volleyball Championships
September 2009 sports events in Europe
October 2009 sports events in Europe
Women's volleyball in Poland